Mission Point may refer to:
Mission Point (California)
Mission Point Light, Michigan
Mission Point (Mackinac Island), Michigan